This list of tallest buildings in Kansas ranks skyscrapers in the U.S. state of Kansas by height. The second-tallest building in the state is the Kansas State Capitol in Topeka, which rises .

Tallest buildings

This list ranks Kansas buildings that stand at least 213 feet (65 m) tall, based on standard height measurement. This includes spires and architectural details but does not include antenna masts or other objects not part of the original plans. Existing structures are included for ranking purposes based on present height.

See also
List of tallest buildings in Wichita
List of tallest buildings in the United States
List of tallest buildings by U.S. state
List of tallest buildings in Kansas City, Missouri

References

Tallest
Kansas